Githopsis diffusa is a species of flowering plant in the bellflower family known by the common name San Gabriel bluecup.

It is native to California and Baja California, where it grows in open habitat on the slopes of foothills and mountains.

Description
Githopsis diffusa is an annual herb forming a small clump at ground level or growing erect to a maximum height near 30 centimeters. The stem may have stiff hairs and the leaves are generally small and pointed.

The small, solitary flower appearing at the tip of the stem is tubular to funnel-shaped and white or purple with a white throat.

References

External links
Jepson Manual Treatment of Githopsis diffusa
Githopsis diffusa — Photo gallery

Campanuloideae
Flora of California
Flora of Baja California
Natural history of the California chaparral and woodlands
Flora of the Klamath Mountains
Flora of the Sierra Nevada (United States)
Natural history of the California Coast Ranges
Natural history of the Channel Islands of California
Natural history of the Peninsular Ranges
Natural history of the San Francisco Bay Area
Natural history of the Santa Monica Mountains
Natural history of the Transverse Ranges
Flora without expected TNC conservation status